Edward Allison "Cally" McCalmon (May 30, 1902 – April 23, 1987) was a Canadian professional ice hockey right winger who played two seasons in the National Hockey League for the Chicago Black Hawks and Philadelphia Quakers. He played 23 games in the 1927–28 season with Chicago, and 16 games in 1930–31 with Philadelphia. The rest of his career, which lasted from 1920 to 1931, was spent in various minor leagues. McCalmon was born in Varney, Ontario, but grew up in Lumsden, Saskatchewan.

Career statistics

Regular season and playoffs

External links

1902 births
1987 deaths
Canadian ice hockey right wingers
Chicago Blackhawks players
Ice hockey people from Saskatchewan
Philadelphia Quakers (NHL) players
Saskatchewan Huskies ice hockey players
Saskatoon Sheiks players
Toronto Millionaires players
Tulsa Oilers (AHA) players